Angela Mizinga (known as Empress Tigris or simply Tigris) is a Malawian singer/rapper from Ntcheu, Malawi.

Early life
Mizinga was born on 14 May to Mr and Mrs T.J. Mizinga as the last born of 10 children, in Ntcheu District. Tigris is not a signed artist, but already has a fan base across Africa and beyond, thanks to the performance she had this year at the Big Brother Amplified Eviction show on 12 June 2011, which gave her exposure to millions. Her dancers are The Elements Dance Crew who are the current best dance crew in Malawi according to the 'U Got Dance Moves' competition by Plusten Links.

Career

Mizinga began her entertainment career as a radio presenter for Capital FM radio.

She became popular as a singer after featuring in "Anankabango" - with singer Young Kay and other singers. She does charity work by raising funds for primary education. She recently donated food and other items to children at Mzuzu Central Hospital.

Her debut album was released in February 2010 and featured collaborations with popular Malawi rappers and singers, Theo Thomson, Tay Grin and Young Kay. She featured in many shows within and outside Malawi. She has been to Johannesburg, Graham's town, Zambia and performed alongside artists including US's Sean Kingston, Brick and Lace, Teargas, Tay Grin and Theo Thomson. She appeared in most Lake of Stars festivals.

Tigris was a nominee for the Malawi Music Awards for Best Female Artist and Best Afro-Pop Artist of 2010–2011. She started her career as a professional musician in August 2009 and already has an album called Gimme a Break which did well on VOA, BBC and most Malawian radio stations. Most of her singles made the charts and stayed in the top 3 for several weeks on Capitol Radio. Her song 'Hottest Chick', which she did with Tay Grin, stayed number one for months. Her second album, Dreams, came out in 2011.

Discography
Anankabango - Young Kay featuring Tigris
Gimme a Break (album) - 2010
Dreams (Album) - 2012

References

Living people
Year of birth missing (living people)